Niels Hansen (11 May 1901 – 1 April 1987) was a Danish footballer. He played in two matches for the Denmark national football team in 1928.

References

External links
 

1901 births
1987 deaths
Danish men's footballers
Denmark international footballers
Place of birth missing
Association footballers not categorized by position